Hot Sands is a 1924 silent film comedy short produced, directed by and starring Monty Banks.  Herman C. Raymaker shares directing credit with Banks. It is preserved in the Library of Congress collection It can be found on some video and dvd outlets.

Cast
Monty Banks -
William Blaisdell - Detective Dick Harris
James T. Kelley - Mr. Leffingwell, Banker

References

External links
Hot Banks at IMDb.com

1924 films
American silent short films
1924 short films
Films directed by Monty Banks
Films directed by Herman C. Raymaker
Silent American comedy films
1924 comedy films
1920s American films